PalaBarbuto, also known by its sponsorship name of PalaEldo, is an indoor sporting arena located in Naples, Italy. The facility is located in Viale Giochi del Mediterraneo, in close proximity to the Olympic swimming pool Piscina Felice Scandone.

History
Originally named after the sports reporter Lello Barbuto and now bearing the name of Eldo Megastore, a chain of Italian electronics mega stores, it is currently the home of the professional basketball teams Nuova AMG Sebastiani Basket of the Lega Basket and Eldo Napoli. In September 2006, its seating capacity was increased to 5,500 in order to comply with Euroleague arena requirements, which at that time required a minimum of 5,000 seats. In 2016, PalaBarbuto was closed for a number of games due to problems with electrical and fire safety systems.

References

Indoor arenas in Italy
Sport in Naples
Basketball venues in Italy